The 2017 Atlantic Hockey Tournament is the 13th Atlantic Hockey Tournament. It was played between March 3 and March 18, 2017 at home campus locations and at the Blue Cross Arena in Rochester, New York. The tournament champion Air Force was granted Atlantic Hockey's automatic bid to the 2017 NCAA Division I Men's Ice Hockey Tournament.

Format
The tournament features four rounds of play. In the first round the sixth and eleventh, seventh and tenth, and eighth and ninth seeds, as determined by the conference regular season standings, will play a best-of-three series with the winners advancing to the quarterfinals. The top five teams from the conference regular season standings receive a bye to the quarterfinals. There, the first seed and lowest-ranked first round winner, the second seed and second-highest-ranked first round winner, the third seed and highest-ranked first round winner, and the fourth seed and the fifth seed will play a best-of-three series, with the winners advancing to the semifinals. In the semifinals, the highest and lowest seeds and second-highest and second-lowest remaining seeds will play a single game each, with the winners advancing to the championship game. The tournament champion will receive an automatic bid to the 2017 NCAA Division I Men's Ice Hockey Tournament.

Standings
Note: GP = Games played; W = Wins; L = Losses; T = Ties; PTS = Points; GF = Goals For; GA = Goals Against

Bracket
Army and Robert Morris finished tied for third. Army wins the 5th tiebreaker (record against #1 seed). RIT, Mercyhurst and Bentley finished tied for sixth place. RIT was seeded sixth with tie breakers over both (head-to-head wins and conference wins) while Mercyhurst was placed seventh (conference wins). 

Note: * denotes overtime period(s)

Results

First round

(6) RIT vs. (11) Niagara

(7) Mercyhurst vs. (10) American International

(8) Bentley vs. (9) Sacred Heart

Quarterfinals

(1) Canisius vs. (11) Niagara

(2) Air Force vs. (8) Bentley

(3) Army vs. (7) Mercyhurst

(4) Robert Morris vs. (5) Holy Cross

Semifinals

(1) Canisius vs. (4) Robert Morris

(2) Air Force vs. (3) Army

Championship

(2) Air Force vs. (4) Robert Morris

Tournament awards

All-Tournament Team
G Shane Starrett* (Air Force)
D Johnny Hrabovsky (Air Force)
D 
F Jordan Himley (Air Force)
F Tyler Ledford (Air Force)
F Brady Ferguson (Robert Morris)
* Most Valuable Player(s)

References

Atlantic Hockey Tournament
Atlantic Hockey Tournament